The 2010 European Speed Skating Championships were held at the indoor ice rink of the Vikingskipet in Hamar (Norway) on 9 and 10 January 2010.

Men championships

Allround results 

NQ = Not qualified for the 10000 m (only the best 12 are qualified)
DNS = Did not start

Source: ISU

Female championships

Allround results 

NQ = Not qualified for the 5000 m (only the best 12 are qualified)
DNS = Did not start

Source: ISU

Rules 
All 24 participating skaters are allowed to skate the first three distances; 12 skaters may take part on the fourth distance. These 12 skaters are determined by taking the standings on the longest of the first three distances, as well as the samalog standings after three distances, and comparing these lists as follows:

 Skaters among the top 12 on both lists are qualified.
 To make up a total of 12, skaters are then added in order of their best rank on either list. Samalog standings take precedence over the longest-distance standings in the event of a tie.

See also 
 2010 World Allround Speed Skating Championships
 Speed skating at the 2010 Winter Olympics

References

External links 
 Resultaten op IsuResults.eu

European Speed Skating Championships, 2010
2010 European
European, 2010
Sport in Hamar
2010 in Norwegian sport